The Reformed Church (Reformierte Kirche) was a church building in Dresden used by the Evangelical-Reformed Church. It was built on Dr.-Külz-Ring in the Altstadt district in 1894, to Neo-Romanesque designs by Harald Julius von Bosse. Severely damaged by bombing in 1945, it was demolished in 1963.

Former churches in Dresden
Dresden
Dresden Reformed